Ilse Geldhof (born 9 April 1973) is a former Belgian racing cyclist. She won the Belgian national road race title in 2008.

References

External links

1973 births
Living people
Belgian female cyclists
Sportspeople from Ypres
Cyclists from West Flanders